A curvature collineation (often abbreviated to CC) is vector field which preserves the Riemann tensor in the sense that,

 

where  are the components of the Riemann tensor. The set of all smooth curvature collineations forms a Lie algebra under the Lie bracket operation (if the smoothness condition is dropped, the set of all curvature collineations need not form a Lie algebra). Every affine vector field is a curvature collineation.

See also 

 Conformal vector field
 Homothetic vector field
 Killing vector field
 Matter collineation
 Spacetime symmetries

Mathematical methods in general relativity